Thijs Aerts (born 3 November 1996) is a Belgian cyclist, who currently rides for UCI Continental team . He competed in the men's under-23 event at the 2016 UCI Cyclo-cross World Championships in Heusden-Zolder.

Major results

2012–2013
 Junior Superprestige
3rd Hoogstraten
 Junior Bpost Bank Trophy
3rd Oostmalle
2013–2014
 UCI Junior World Cup
1st Nommay
1st Hoogerheide
3rd Koksijde
3rd Heusden-Zolder
 Junior Superprestige
2nd Ruddervoorde
2nd Gieten
3rd Gavere
3rd Hoogstraten
 Junior Bpost Bank Trophy
3rd Oostmalle
 1st Junior Eeklo
 2nd Junior Erpe-Mere
 3rd National Junior Championships
2015–2016
 1st  National Under-23 Championships
 Under-23 Bpost Bank Trophy
2nd GP Sven Nys
 Under-23 Superprestige
3rd Middelkerke
2016–2017
 Under-23 DVV Trophy
2nd Azencross
2nd GP Sven Nys
2nd Krawatencross
 Under-23 Superprestige
2nd Spa-Francorchamps
 UCI Under-23 World Cup
3rd Namur
3rd Hoogerheide
 3rd Under-23 Oostmalle
2017–2018
 1st  National Under-23 Championships
 3rd Overall UCI Under-23 World Cup
1st Nommay
2nd Zeven
 1st Under-23 Oostmalle
 Under-23 DVV Trophy
2nd Essen
2nd Krawatencross
 Under-23 Superprestige
2nd Hoogstraten
3rd Gavere
 2nd Under-23 Overijse
2018–2019
 3rd Mol
 3rd Rucphen
2019–2020
 National Trophy Series
1st Crawley
 1st Contern
 Rectavit Series
3rd Niel
2021–2022
 1st La Grandville
 Ethias Cross
2nd Essen
 2nd Trek Cup

References

External links
 
 

1996 births
Living people
Cyclo-cross cyclists
Belgian male cyclists
21st-century Belgian people